The men event of the 2015 World Sprint Speed Skating Championships was held on 28 February – 1 March 2015.

Results

500 m
The race was started at 18:19.

1000 m
The race was started at 20:07.

500 m
The race was started at 19:13.

1000 m
The race was started at 20:56.

Overall standings
After all events.

References

Men